Psychoanalysis and History is a peer-reviewed academic journal published biannually in January and July by Edinburgh University Press. It covers the history of psychoanalysis and the application of psychoanalytic ideas to historiography. It aims to provide a bridge "between the academic study of history and psychoanalysis".

John Forrester (1949–2015), a historian and philosopher of science from the University of Cambridge, was its principal director.

References

Bibliography 
 Anne Ber-Schiavetta, « Histoire de la psychanalyse, histoire des sciences. Renouvellements et convergences », Revue française de psychanalyse, 2020/1 (Vol. 84), DOI : 10.3917/rfp.841.0223,

External links 
 

Psychoanalysis journals
Publications established in 1999
Edinburgh University Press academic journals
History of psychology journals
English-language journals
Biannual journals